The 1946 Gent–Wevelgem was the eighth edition of the Gent–Wevelgem cycle race and was held on 26 May 1946. The race started in Ghent and finished in Wevelgem. The race was won by Ernest Sterckx.

General classification

References

Gent–Wevelgem
1946 in road cycling
1946 in Belgian sport
May 1946 sports events in Europe